Mah-e Asal (meaning "honeymoon") was an Iranian, Persian language, popular daily television program broadcast by Channel 3 during Ramadan. The host of the program was Ehsan Alikhani. The main subject of the program was the life of ordinary people who have had an extraordinary rare experience.

The program aired daily from 2007 to 2018 during Ramadan, often collaborating with Iran's judicial system, which is based on Islamic law and includes the "eye for an eye" principle. It finished broadcasting and production after 12 years in 2018.

The storyline of the 2019 film Yalda, a Night for Forgiveness, directed by Massoud Bakhshi, is based on the show, but transposes it to Yaldā Night instead of Ramadan. In the film, a young woman convicted of murder pleads for forgiveness from the daughter of the victim, while the audience can sms their votes to help pay for the blood money.

Notable guests
Yassi Ashki
Narges Kalbasi
Parastoo Salehi

References

Iranian television shows
2000s Iranian television series
2010s Iranian television series
Islamic Republic of Iran Broadcasting original programming
2007 Iranian television series debuts
Persian-language television shows
Ramadan special television shows